Quadrasiella is a genus of minute, salt marsh snails with an operculum, aquatic gastropod mollusks, or micromollusks, in the family Assimineidae.

Species
Species within the genus Quadrisella include:
 Quadrasiella clathrata
 Quadrasiella mucronata

References

 WoRMS entry for the genus

 
Assimineidae
Taxonomy articles created by Polbot